Crostwick is a village in the English county of Norfolk. The village is part of the civil parish of Horstead with Stanninghall. Crostwick is located 2.6 miles from Wroxham and 5.2 miles from Norwich.

History
Crostwick's name is of Viking origin and derives from the Old Norse for a clearing around a cross.

In the Domesday Book, Crostwick is listed as a settlement of 14 households in the hundred of Taverham. In 1086, the village was divided between the estates of Ralph de Beaufour and Roger de Poitou.

Geography
Crostwick falls within the constituency of Broadland and is represented at Parliament by Jerome Mayhew MP of the Conservative Party.

St. Peter's Church
Crostwick's parish church is of Norman origin and dedicated to Saint Peter. The church was significantly remodelled in the Nineteenth Century and has a carved font from the same period depicting several saints. The church also features examples of stained glass by William Wailes in 1853 and later restored in the Twentieth Century by King & Sons.

War Memorial
Crostwick's and Beeston's war memorial is located close to the North Walsham Road and takes the form of a rough hewn stone Celtic cross. The memorial lists the following names as fallen from both villages during the First World War:
 Second-Lieutenant John D. Patteson (1889-1914), 5th Dragoon Guards
 Corporal Walter J. Sandy (1896-1918), 5th Battalion, Machine Gun Corps
 Corporal Robert J. Parfitt (d.1917), 8th Battalion, Suffolk Regiment
 Private Frederick A. Thaxton (1890-1916), 7th Battalion, Royal Norfolk Regiment
 Private Henry J. Holmes (1884-1917), 1/4th Battalion, Northumberland Fusiliers
 James Coffin

And, the following for the Second World War:
 Petty-Officer Claude R. Goymer (1903-1940), HMS Patroclus
 Walter E. Dix

Notes

External links

Broadland
Villages in Norfolk
Civil parishes in Norfolk